The Föppl–von Kármán equations, named after August Föppl and Theodore von Kármán, are a set of nonlinear partial differential equations describing the large deflections of thin flat plates. With applications ranging from the design of submarine hulls to the mechanical properties of cell wall, the equations are notoriously difficult to solve, and take the following form:

The 2-dimensional biharmonic operator is defined as

Equation (1) above can be derived from kinematic assumptions and the constitutive relations for the plate.  Equations (2) are the two equations for the conservation of linear momentum in two dimensions where it is assumed that the out–of–plane stresses are zero.

Validity of the Föppl–von Kármán equations 
While the Föppl–von Kármán equations are of interest from a purely mathematical point of view, the physical validity of these equations is questionable. Ciarlet states: The two-dimensional von Karman equations for plates, originally proposed by von Karman [1910], play a mythical role in applied mathematics. While they have been abundantly, and satisfactorily, studied from the mathematical standpoint, as regards notably various questions of existence, regularity, and bifurcation, of their solutions, their physical soundness has been often seriously questioned.  Reasons include the facts that
 the theory depends on an approximate geometry which is not clearly defined
 a given variation of stress over a cross-section is assumed arbitrarily
 a linear constitutive relation is used that does not correspond to a known relation between well defined measures of stress and strain
 some components of strain are arbitrarily ignored
 there is a confusion between reference and deformed configurations which makes the theory inapplicable to the large deformations for which it was apparently devised.
Conditions under which these equations are actually applicable and will give reasonable results when solved are discussed in Ciarlet.

Equations in terms of Airy stress function 
The three Föppl–von Kármán equations can be reduced to two by introducing the Airy stress function  where

Equation (1) becomes

while the Airy function satisfies, by construction the force balance equation (2).
enforcing the representation of the strain as a function of the stress. One gets

Pure bending

is called flexural or cylindrical rigidity of the plate.

Kinematic assumptions (Kirchhoff hypothesis) 
In the derivation of the Föppl–von Kármán equations the main kinematic assumption (also known as the Kirchhoff hypothesis) is that surface normals to the plane of the plate remain perpendicular to the plate after deformation.  It is also assumed that the in-plane (membrane) displacements are small and the change in thickness of the plate is negligible.  These assumptions imply that the displacement field  in the plate can be expressed as

This form of the displacement field implicitly assumes that the amount of rotation of the plate is small.

Strain-displacement relations (von Kármán strains) 
The components of the three-dimensional Lagrangian Green strain tensor are defined as

Substitution of the expressions for the displacement field into the above gives

For small strains but moderate rotations, the higher order terms that cannot be neglected are

Neglecting all other higher order terms, and enforcing the requirement that the plate does not change its thickness, the strain tensor components reduce to the von Kármán strains

The first terms are the usual small-strains, for the mid-surface. The second terms, involving squares of displacement gradients, are non-linear, and need to be considered when the plate bending is fairly large (when the rotations are about 10 – 15 degrees). These first two terms together are called the membrane strains. The last terms, involving second derivatives, are the flexural (bending) strains. They involve the curvatures. These zero terms are due to the assumptions of the classical plate theory, which assume elements normal to the mid-plane remain inextensible and line elements perpendicular to the mid-plane remain normal to the mid-plane after deformation.

Stress–strain relations 
If we assume that the Cauchy stress tensor components are linearly related to the von Kármán strains by Hooke's law, the plate is isotropic and homogeneous, and that the plate is under a plane stress condition, we have  =  =  = 0 and

Expanding the terms, the three non-zero stresses are

Stress resultants 
The stress resultants in the plate are defined as

Therefore,

the elimination of the in-plane displacements leads to 

and

Solutions are easier to find when the governing equations are expressed in terms of stress resultants rather than the in-plane stresses.

Equations of Equilibrium 
The weak form of the Kirchhoff plate is

here  Ω denotes the mid-plane. The weak form leads to 

The resulting governing equations are

Föppl–von Kármán equations in terms of stress resultants 
The Föppl–von Kármán equations are typically derived with an energy approach by considering variations of internal energy and the virtual work done by external forces.  The resulting static governing equations (Equations of Equilibrium) are

When the deflections are small compared to the overall dimensions of the plate, and the mid-surface strains are neglected,  

.

The equations of equilibrium are reduced (pure bending of thin plates) to

.

References

See also 
 Plate theory

Partial differential equations
Continuum mechanics